The General Aircraft G.A.L.38 Fleet Shadower was a British long-range patrol aircraft design of the immediate pre-Second World War period. The Fleet Shadower was a highly specialized aircraft intended to follow enemy naval task forces over long times and radio back position information. However, the concept produced an ungainly and ultimately unsuccessful type. The Airspeed Fleet Shadower, built to the same requirement and of broadly similar appearance, also did not progress past the prototype stage.

Design and development
The G.A.L.38 Fleet Shadower and the Airspeed A.S.39 Fleet Shadower were produced to meet Specification S.23/37, which came from the Royal Navy's "Operational Requirement OR.52" for an aircraft that could shadow enemy fleets at night. Three other companies were also involved initially: Percival, Short Brothers and Fairey Aviation. Following evaluation of the designs General Aircraft and Airspeed were contracted to build two prototypes each, General Aircraft contract dated 15 November 1938.

The design would also have to be able to operate from an aircraft carrier flight deck and hence use a folding wing configuration for easier deck storage. It would have to give good views for the observer and be quiet at cruising speed.

The G.A.L.38 and the A.S.39 designs were similar – both high-wing aircraft with fixed landing gear using four small Pobjoy Niagara V engines spread across the wings to generate lift at low speed. There was an observer's position in a glazed compartment in the nose and a radio operator's station in the fuselage behind the pilot's cockpit.

The aircraft was fitted with various devices to increase lift; slotted flaps and slotted ailerons and, on the low wing sponsons, split flaps. The wings folded back, pivoted close to the fuselage, on hydraulic power.

Due to development problems at Pobjoy with the Niagara V, it was decided to use the lower-powered Niagara III civil version. The first G.A.L.38 Fleet Shadower (also known as the "Night Shadower") flew on 13 May 1940 with the Niagara III engines. An innovative use of the "propwash" generated by propellers directed over the full-span flaps led to an impressive minimum speed of 39 mph (63 km/h) which would have allowed the Fleet Shadower to cruise effortlessly above an enemy fleet.  During testing the aircraft suffered from aerodynamic stability problems, but not as bad as the Airspeed design which was cancelled in February 1941. The aircraft had major modification before flying again in June 1941 with the Niagara V engines; the three tail fins having been replaced by a single large fin. With the incomplete second G.A.L.38 being used as a spares source, test flying continued until September 1941. In October 1941 the company was instructed to scrap the second aircraft, and in March 1942 instructions were issued to scrap the prototype as well.

The concept of a fleet patrol aircraft was superseded by the wartime development of effective Air to Surface (ASV) radar that could be fitted in long-range patrol aircraft such as the Consolidated Liberator I. In February 1941, the Royal Navy cancelled the project.

Specifications

See also

References
Notes

Bibliography

 Bridgman, Leonard, ed. Jane’s All The World’s Aircraft 1945-1946. London: Samson Low, Marston & Company, Ltd 1946.
 Bridgeman, Leonard (ed). Jane's Fighting Aircraft of World War II. Twickenham, Tiger Books, 1998. .
 Butler, Phil. "The Night Shawdowers." Air-Britain Aeromilitaria Vol. 32, Issue 125, Spring 2006, p. 19-22. ISSB 0262-8791.
 Swanborough, Gordon. British Aircraft at War, 1939-1945. East Sussex, UK: HPC Publishing, 1997. .
 Winchester, Jim, ed. "General Aircraft Fleet Shadower (1940)". The World's Worst Aircraft: From Pioneering Failures to Multimillion Dollar Disasters. London: Amber Books Ltd., 2005. .

External links

 Profile - Flying Slow - Fleet Shadower concept
 Fleet Air Arm archive
 GAL 38

1940s British patrol aircraft
Cancelled military aircraft projects of the United Kingdom
Fleet Shadower
Carrier-based aircraft
Four-engined tractor aircraft
High-wing aircraft
Aircraft first flown in 1940
Four-engined piston aircraft